Houbraken is a Dutch-language surname. People with this surname include:

Antonina Houbraken (1686–1736), Dutch artist, daughter of Arnold Houbraken
Arnold Houbraken (1660–1719), Dutch biographer of artists, and engraver
Jacobus Houbraken (1698–1780), Dutch engraver, son of Arnold Houbraken
Joannes van Houbraken (c. 1600–after 1661), Flemish painter and art dealer

Surnames